The hidden ground skink  (Lipinia inconspicua) is a species of skink found in Indonesia.

References

Lipinia
Reptiles described in 1894
Taxa named by Fritz Müller (doctor)